Horst Beyer may refer to:

 Horst Beyer (Paralympian), German Paralympian
 Horst Beyer (decathlete) (1940–2017), German decathlete